Ain't Life Grand is the second and final studio album by American hard rock band Slash's Snakepit, released on October 10, 2000. The songs "Been There Lately" and "Mean Bone" were released as singles, and along with "Shine", had promo videos created for them.

Track listing
All songs written by Slash's Snakepit; additional writers noted.

Notes
Tracks 1, 3, 6, 10, 11, 13, and 14 written by Slash, Johnny Griparic, Rod Jackson, Matt Laug, and Ryan Roxie.
Tracks 2, 4, 7–9, and 12 written by Slash, Griparic, Jackson, Laug, Roxie, and Jack Douglas.
Track 5 written by Slash, Griparic, Jackson, Laug, Roxie, and Jeff Paris.

Personnel

Slash's Snakepit
Slash – lead and rhythm guitars, six-string bass, slide guitar
Rod Jackson – lead vocals
Ryan Roxie – rhythm guitar, backing vocals, lead guitar on "Rusted Heroes"
Johnny Griparic – bass
Matt Laug – drums

Additional musicians
Teddy Andreadis – keyboards, backing vocals
Collin Douglas – percussion
Jimmy "Z" Zavala – saxophone, harmonica
Lee Thornburg – trumpet
Jeff Paris – backing vocals
Karen Lawrence – backing vocals
Kelly Hansen – backing vocals
Kim Nail – backing vocals
Raya Beam – vocals on "Mean Bone"

Production 
Jack Douglas – production, sitar, backing vocals
Jay Messina – mixing
Jim Mitchell – additional production, engineering
Ales Olssen – engineering assistance
John Tyree – engineering assistance
Maurizio "Maui" Tiella – engineering assistance
George Marino – mastering
Greg Calbi – mastering

Miscellaneous
The album cover artwork has been released by ConArt, a graphic company owned by Slash's brother.
 The cassette promo version KOC-PRO-1062 entitled Snippet's From: Slash's Snakepit Ain't Life Grand contains 3 unreleased tracks that contain a "personal message from Slash".
There is an early version of Ain't Life Grand released in very limited quantity by Interscope before Slash left the company in 2000 that was meant for the company's staff only. Two unreleased songs are on it: "Bleed" and "What Kind Of Life". Also included is the rare song "Something About Your Love". This versions tracklist is as follows: 1. Been There Lately 2. Anything (Just Like Anything) 3. Shine 4. One Mean Bone (Mean Bone) 5. Break You (Back to the Moment) 6. The Truth 7. Landslide 8. Ain't Life Grand 9. Speed Parade 10. Serial Killer 11. Something About Your Love 12. The Alien 13. Breed 14. What Kind of Life?

Charts

References

External links

2000 albums
Slash's Snakepit albums
Albums produced by Jack Douglas (record producer)